The River is a 1929 partial-talkie drama film directed by Frank Borzage, and starring Charles Farrell and Mary Duncan. Much of the film has been lost. A reconstructed Version with the about 45 minutes of surviving film, using still images and explanatory titlecards to bridge the missing scenes, was produced by the Munich Filmmuseum, in collaboration with the cinémathèques of Switzerland and Luxembourg. This version was screened in 2006 by the American Museum of the Moving Image in New York City. Borzage also directed Farrell, opposite Janet Gaynor, in Seventh Heaven (1927), Street Angel (1928), and Lucky Star (1929) during this period.

Plot summary
Allen John Spender (Charles Farrell) is a virile outdoorsman and Rosalee (Mary Duncan) is his high society sweetheart.

Cast
 Charles Farrell as Allen John Spender
 Mary Duncan as Rosalee
 Ivan Linow as Sam Thompson
 Margaret Mann as Widow Thompson
 Alfred Sabato as Marsdon 
 Bert Woodruff as The Miller

Reception
Revue du Cinema critic Jean George Auriol described The River as "undoubtedly the most lyrical love film ever made."

References

External links
 
 
 

1929 films
1929 romantic drama films
American black-and-white films
American romantic drama films
Fox Film films
Films directed by Frank Borzage
Films produced by William Fox
Transitional sound films
1920s American films
Silent romantic drama films